Franz Anton Knittel  (April 3, 1721 – December 10, 1792) was a German, Lutheran orthodox theologian, priest, and palaeographer. He examined palimpsests' text of the Codex Guelferbytanus 64 Weissenburgensis and deciphered text of Codex Carolinus. He was the author of many works.

Life 

In 1751 he became a priest, in 1753 Archdeacon of the main church in Wolfenbüttel. In 1766 he became general superintendent and the first preacher in Wolfenbüttel and in 1776 general superintendent in Brunswick.
After receiving work in the main church of Wolfenbüttel Knittel started to examine manuscripts housed in the Ducal Library of Wolfenbüttel. In 1756 he studied the Codex Guelferbytanus 64 Weissenburgensis. The manuscript and its palimpsest text had earlier been examined by Heusinger, who described it in 1752, but Knittel was the first who recognized that the palimpsest Greek text belonged to two different manuscripts of the New Testament. Knittel also deciphered and reconstructed the Gothic-Latin text of the palimpsest and published it in 1762 at Brunswick. It is known as Codex Carolinus. The upper text of palimpsest contains text of Isidore of Seville's Origines and his six letters. Knittel designated it by siglum E and dated it to the 11th century.

Knittel made many errors in deciphering the palimpsest's text, especially in the Latin text of Codex Carolinus (e.g. enarrabilia for scrutabilia). Tischendorf made a new and more accurate collation for the Latin text (edited in 1855). A new collation of the Gothic text was published by Carla Falluomini in 1999. Knittel examined also other manuscripts (e.g. Minuscule 126, 429).

Knittel defended a traditional point of view in theology and was against the modern textual criticism. He defended an authenticity of the Pericopa Adulterae (John 7:53-8:11), Comma Johanneum (1 John 5:7), and Testimonium Flavianum. According to him Erasmus in his Novum Instrumentum omne did not incorporate the Comma from Codex Montfortianus, because of grammar differences, but used Complutensian Polyglotta. According to him the Comma was known for Tertullian.

Works 
 Gedanken von einem Lehrgebaude einer gemessenen Geistlerlehre und ihrem Bussen in der Gottesgelahrtheit 1746
 Epistola, in qua de eo, quod in Georgicis Hesiodes, quae εργα και ημεραι inscribuntur, supposititium est, disseruit de salis vallibus et a viro celebrrimo in arte critica M. horum, quae accusantus, vindice atquae assertore, dissentit, Brunsvick 1754
 Neue Gedanken von den allgemeinen Christsehlern in den Handschriften des Neuen Testamtns u. s. w., mebst einem Versuche einer hermeneutischen Muthmassunge - Sitten - Lehre der ersten Kirche, Braunschweig 1755
 Praecopium Ulphilanum primum, Brunovici 1758; alterum 1760
 Ulphilae versionem Gothicam nonnullorum capitum epistolae Pauli ad Romanos e litura MS. rescript Bibliothecae Guelferbytanae, cum variis monumentis ineditis eruit, commentatus est, detitque foras, Brunovici 1762
 Friedenspredigt, Braunschweig 1763
 Prisca ruris ecclesia, Brunovici 1767
 Beyträge zur Kritik über Johannes Offenbarung, Schröder, Braunschweig und Hildensheim 1773.
 Neue Kritiken über das weltberühmte Zeugnis dea alten Juden Flav. Josephus von Jesu Christo Braunschweig 1779
 Neue Kritiken über den berühmten Sprych: Drey sind, die da zeugen im Himmel, der Vater, das Wort, und der heilige Geist, und diese drei sind eins Braunschweig 1785
 Ueber die Aufklärung des Lachmannes, Frankfurt und Leipzig 1787

References

Further reading 
 Johann Georg Neusel, Lexicon der vom Jahr 1750 bis 1800 verstorberen Teuschen Schriftsteller (Leipzig 1898), pp. 133–135.
 Heinrich Döring, Franz Anton Knittel, Die deutschen Kanzelredner des achtzehnten und neunzehnten Jahrhunderts, pp. 171–175.

External links 
 Fragmenta versionis Ulphilanae: continentia particulas aliquot epistolae Pauli ad Romanos (Upsaliae 1763)
 Franz Anton Knittel & William Alleyn Evanson, New criticisms on the celebrated text: 1 John V. 7. "For there are three that bear record in heaven, the Father, the Word, and the Holy Ghost; and these three are one." A synodical lecture, 1829. 

1721 births
1792 deaths
German scholars
German Lutheran theologians
18th-century German Lutheran clergy
18th-century German Protestant theologians
German male non-fiction writers
18th-century German male writers